Jane Florence Benitez De Leon (born November 22, 1998) is a Filipina actress, singer, model, and dancer. She was a former member of a noontime show dance group Girltrends. She is known for her portrayal of Darna in the 2022 Philippine television series of the same name.

Early life
Jane Florence Benitez de Leon was born on November 22, 1998, in Quezon City, Philippines, to Maricor Benitez-De-Leon, a housewife and Ruel Florencio de Leon, a businessman. She is the youngest in the family with an older brother named Francis. Her family was living well growing up, until her father lost his job. This forced her to audition for various modeling and acting projects. De Leon and her family became unfortunate that they couldn't afford basic needs. During her one-on-one interview with columnist Ogie Diaz on one of his YouTube videos, De Leon revealed that she would often sneak out at night, together with her mother to come to Metro Manila for various auditions as her father greatly opposed De Leon's passion for acting. Before becoming a commercial model and actress, De Leon's mother encouraged her to join various beauty pageants. Her father had four other children from his prior relationships namely Ned, Kirox, Carol, and Karen. She attended Sampaguita Village Elementary School and San Roque Elementary School in San Pedro, Laguna for her primary schooling and Sampaguita Village National High School for secondary studies. In 2016, her father died due to lung cancer, after that she went on to pursue her luck for show business.

Career

2013-2019: Early work and career beginnings
De Leon joined various beauty pageants and auditioned for modeling stints as she was first interested in becoming a commercial model rather than an actress. It was in one of her modeling stints that she got discovered by a talent scout from GMA Network. De Leon formally began her career as an actress signed under the GMA Artists Agency from 2013 to 2015 but unfortunately, she was not given a project. In 2015, Tyronne Escalante, chief executive officer and founder of Tyronne Escalante Artist Management discovered her and brought her to Star Magic where her career with ABS-CBN started. She landed supporting roles in a fantasy drama La Luna Sangre top billed by Daniel Padilla and Kathryn Bernardo. She also acted on various episodes of Wansapanataym and as a rape victim in crime drama anthology Ipaglaban Mo. De Leon debuted as supporting actress in her first movie, Ex with Benefits (2015) alongside Derek Ramsey and Coleen Garcia. She later on starred as one of the main casts for the movie The Debutantes released in 2017 alongside Sue Ramirez. In 2016, De Leon was launched as a member of Girltrends, a female dance group of a noontime variety show, It's Showtime. In 2017, De Leon auditioned for the global pop group Now United along with Bailey May, AC Bonifacio and Ylona Garcia in Los Angeles, but she failed to make the final cut. In 2018, De Leon played a role on a coming-of-age film Walwal produced by Star Cinema. She acted alongside Donny Pangilinan, Elmo Magalona and Devon Seron. In 2019, De Leon was included as cast of ABS-CBN primetime series Halik alongside Jericho Rosales wherein she played the role of Margarita "Maggie" Bartolome, this was considered her biggest project at that time. In the same year, she was cast in a minor role in a Regal Entertainment horror film The Heiress.

2019- present: Darna and breakthrough

As early as 2013, ABS-CBN acquired the rights to air Mars Ravelo comic series into movies, and the first role in development was the female superhero Darna. Erik Matti signed to direct a new Darna film in 2014, with Star Cinema and Matti's Reality Entertainment co-producing the project. It was Angel Locsin who initially chosen to play the role but later on changed to Liza Soberano due to Locsin's spinal injury. In 2018, Soberano also backed out for the role due to a finger injury which led to ABS-CBN holding auditions for the role. ABS-CBN even opened the auditions to the public via their talent scouts and Starhunt camps. Despite being relatively new to show business, De Leon beat over 300 women, including other more popular celebrities who auditioned for the coveted "Darna" role.  On July 17, 2019, De Leon was announced as the actress to play the titular character in the film Darna, her biggest project to date. Director Olivia Lamasan explained that De Leon earned the unanimous vote of ABS-CBN executives and Darna director Jerold Tarog. It was even Tarog who presented De Leon's audition tapes to the executives and according to him, De Leon impressed him for being an "instinctive actress." The network released the video of the announcement in July of that year, which showed de Leon shocked as she received the biggest news in her career. In the video, de Leon was questioned by network executives on just how committed she was in taking on the role wherein she promised a hundred percent commitment to it. When de Leon was finally unveiled as the new Darna, former Star Magic chairman and director Johnny Manahan shared that he made the young actress go to the auditions because he believed in her capabilities as an actress. The announcement became trending on various social media sites which gave a breakthrough for her career. However, in August 2020, it was announced that the film project would be postponed indefinitely due to the COVID-19 pandemic and a Darna TV series, also starring De Leon, would be developed in its place.

In 2021, De Leon joined the cast of FPJ's Ang Probinsyano as guest cast. Because of her guesting on the show, the production for her upcoming Darna series was postponed. After her exit from the show, she started preparing for her role as Darna which was set to roll in November of that year, but later on postponed again for unknown reason This confirmation came after ABS-CBN revealed that Chito Roño would be directing the series. In preparation for the role, she started vigorous trainings and worked out to prepare for her fight scenes required for the role. She also had to practice modulating her voice for her character's signature yell "Darna!" On August 15, 2022, Darna finally premiered, replacing Ang Probinsyano in its time slot. De Leon graced the cover of Metro magazine for the first time after her costume for Darna was revealed on TV. On an interview from Metro, De Leon talked about how her middle-class mother almost gambled on everything else to get her to the terrain of success, De Leon recollects her memory and reminisces how hard her beginning was.

Philanthropy
In September 2019, De Leon was announced as the winner for the Belo Beauty Special Award at the annual ABS-CBN Ball. During the interview with ABS-CBN, she revealed that instead of taking the proceeds from the award, she decided to give it all to the beneficiary of the said Ball - the social welfare programme, Bantay Bata 163. This foundation aims to protect disadvantaged and at-risk children through a nationwide network of social services. De Leon said that it is better to be an example to help these children, who may have their own ideas on what they want for the future lives. In the same year, De Leon also attended the Red Charity Gala, to raise funds for the Philippine Red Cross, a non-profit humanitarian organization and a member of the International Red Cross and Red Crescent Movement.

Filmography

Film

Television

Music video appearances

Awards & recognitions

References

External links
 
 

1998 births
Living people
ABS-CBN personalities
Star Magic
Filipino female models
Filipino film actresses
Filipino television actresses
People from Quezon City
21st-century Filipino actresses